Ccotapampa is a populated place in the mountain-like terrain of the Department of Ayacucho, Peru.

References

http://www.indexmundi.com/z/?lat=-15.29&lon=-73.1961111&t=p&r=2780&p=ccotapampa&cc=pe&c=peru

Populated places in the Ayacucho Region